John Hoar (1622 – April 2, 1704) was a militia leader & Indian liaison in colonial Massachusetts during King Philip's War.  He is best known for securing the release of Mary Rowlandson from Indian captivity at Redemption Rock. The event was depicted in the best selling book The Sovereignty and Goodness of God: Being a Narrative of the Captivity and Restoration of Mrs. Mary Rowlandson.

Ransom of Mary Rowlandson
On Feb. 10, 1676, during an Indian attack on her hometown of Lancaster, Massachusetts Mary Rowlandson, wife of the village minister Joseph Rowlandson, was taken prisoner with three of her children by a band of Nipmuc warriors. Hoar, a prominent lawyer and Indian missionary, was requested by the Rev. Rowlandson to act as the colonial representative in the negotiation for her release. Hoar departed Lancaster on April 28, 1676 with two native guides, Nepphonet and Peter Tatatiquinea to meet King Philip's War party at Wachusett Lake, located in what is now Princeton, Massachusetts. On May 2, after eleven weeks in captivity, Rowlandson was released to Hoar for a £20 ransom at the glacial stone outcropping known today as Redemption Rock. Rowlandson would go on to write a famous narrative of her experience as a captive, The Sovereignty and Goodness of God: Being a Narrative of the Captivity and Restoration of Mrs. Mary Rowlandson which became a bestseller throughout the English speaking world. It is considered to be a seminal work in the American literary genre of captivity narratives and also ranks as the first published book written by a colonial American woman.

Life and Family
John Hoar was born in 1622 in Gloucester, Gloucestershire, England. He died on 2 Apr 1704 in Concord, Middlesex Co., Massachusetts.  There is no recorded date for his birth.  He is mentioned in his grandfather's will of 1632 and there is a record of apprenticeship to his father dated the next year which indicates that he was eleven years old at that time and thus born in 1622.  It is estimated that his widowed mother emigrated to Massachusetts about 1641 and soon settled in Scituate, Mass.  The first evidence of John's settlement in Scituate is a list of men of the town bearing arms dated 1643. In 1659, he moved to Concord, where he later tried to give shelter to John Eliot's Praying Indians during King Philip's War.  However, his neighbors prevented this and took the Indians to Deer Island where they perished.  Because of his good relations with the Indians, he was asked to rescue Mrs. Rowlandson and her children.

He was known to have a wife named, Alice, but there is no record of her last name or the date of their marriage.  It has been incorrectly stated that he married an Alice Lisle, a daughter of Lord Lisle.  However, it was his brother, Leonard, a graduate of Oxford University and later president of Harvard College, who had married Bridget, daughter of John Lord Lisle, President of the High Court of Justice for the trial of Charles I.  Bridget's mother was Dame Alicia Lisle, a victim of Royalist justice, who was beheaded after being tried by Judge Jeffreys in 1685 .  John and Leonard Hoar's sister, Joanna, married Edmund Quincy of Braintree. One of their descendants, Abigail Smith, married John Adams of the American Revolution. Robert Sidney was coincidentally granted the title of Viscount Lisle on 4 May 1605, allowing the "Lisle" title to be passed on through to his descendants, adding further confusion for researchers in search of the identity of Hoar's wife. Currently, no physical or reliable evidence exists providing John Hoar's wife's maiden name, as many early records from the Concord colony have been lost. Their children were Mary, Elizabeth, Joanna, and Daniel.

Note that the only reference to Alice as a child of Lord Lisle is from the late 1800s, and there is no reference to Alice's surname in records contemporary to her life. The petition to Parliament regarding the estate of Lord Lisle's martyred wife is signed by Bridget Lisle Hoar and Bridget's sisters, but not by Alice Hoar, who was living at that time.

References

1622 births
1704 deaths
King Philip's War
People from Gloucester
People of colonial Massachusetts